Howard Alan Kurtz (born August 1, 1953) is an American journalist and author best known for his coverage of the media.

Kurtz is the host of Fox News's Media Buzz program, the successor to Fox News Watch. He is the former media writer for The Washington Post and the former Washington bureau chief for The Daily Beast. He has written five books about the media. Kurtz left CNN and joined Fox News in 2013.

Early life and education 

Kurtz was born to a Jewish family in the Sheepshead Bay neighborhood of Brooklyn, New York, the son of Marcia, a homemaker, and Leonard Kurtz, a clothing executive. He is a 1970 graduate of Sheepshead Bay High School
and the University at Buffalo (State University of New York). In college he worked on a student newspaper, the Spectrum, becoming the editor his senior year. Kurtz earned a B. A. (psychology and English) in 1974. He then attended the Columbia University Graduate School of Journalism.

Career 

After college, Kurtz went to work for the Record in New Jersey. He moved to Washington D.C. to work as a reporter for syndicated columnist Jack Anderson. Kurtz left Anderson to join The Washington Star, an afternoon paper. When the newspaper closed in 1981, Kurtz was hired at The Washington Post by Bob Woodward, then the Metro editor. Kurtz has also written for The New Republic, The Washington Monthly, and New York magazine.

The Washington Post 

Kurtz joined the staff of The Washington Post in 1981 and left in 2010 (29 years). He served there as a national affairs correspondent, New York bureau chief and deputy national editor. Kurtz covered the news media between 1990 and 2010 for The Washington Post.

Reliable Sources on CNN 

From 1998 until 2013, Kurtz served as host of the weekly CNN program Reliable Sources, a cable television program that explores the standards, performance and biases of the media. Kurtz led the scrutinizing of the media's fairness and objectivity by questioning journalists of top news organizations, including those at CNN. The show premiered in 1992 when it originated as a one-hour special to discuss the media's coverage of the Persian Gulf War.

The Daily Beast 

In October 2010, Kurtz announced he was moving to the online publication The Daily Beast. He served as the Washington bureau chief for the website, writing on media and politics until 2013. His salary at The Daily Beast was reported to be $600,000 a year. On May 2, 2013, the site's editor-in-chief Tina Brown announced that Kurtz and The Daily Beast had "parted company". It occurred in the aftermath of a controversy in which Kurtz incorrectly accused NBA player Jason Collins of failing to acknowledge a former heterosexual engagement when he came out as a homosexual, but Kurtz stated the parting was mutual and "in the works for some time". Sources inside the Daily Beast newsroom have stated that Kurtz's departure became inevitable once he began writing for and promoting a lesser-known media website called Daily Download. Kurtz was previously the subject of controversy when Nancy Pelosi denied making a statement Kurtz attributed to her, and a quote Kurtz attributed to Darrell Issa was reported to have actually been made by his spokesperson.  Brown later said on Twitter she fired Kurtz for "serial inaccuracy".

Fox News 

On June 20, 2013, Kurtz left CNN to join Fox News Channel to host a weekend media program and write a column for FoxNews.com. Kurtz's Media Buzz replaced the Fox News Watch program hosted by Jon Scott.

Books 

Media Circus: The Trouble with America's Newspapers (1993) identifies problems afflicting U.S. newspapers and offers suggestions. Among the issues identified are timid leadership, a spreading tabloid approach to news with a growing focus on celebrities and personal scandal, poor coverage of racial issues and the Persian Gulf war, increasing bureaucracy and a pasteurization of the news.

Hot Air: All Talk, All the Time (1997) describes failings of the talk-show and political talk-show format even as it had been rapidly proliferating on television and radio. Some problems he identifies include superficiality, lies, hysteria, lack of preparation, sensationalism and conflicts of interest.

Spin Cycle: Inside the Clinton Propaganda Machine (1998) describes various techniques used by the Clinton White House to put spin on the controversies and scandals surrounding the Clintons and to refocus the attention of the media on topics other than non-issues focused on by the media.

The Fortune Tellers: Inside Wall Street's Game of Money, Media, and Manipulation (2000) addresses the growing public fascination with stock market trading as fueled by cable television shows and internet sites providing platforms to pundits, stock touts and brokerage firm stock analysts. The potential for manipulation of the media and the public by stock market insiders is discussed.

Reality Show: Inside the Last Great Television News War (2007) chronicles the struggles at TV networks ABC, NBC and CBS to enhance the stature, credibility and audience draw of their anchors of the evening network news programs. The book's focus is on ABC's Charles Gibson, CBS's Katie Couric and NBC's Brian Williams.

Media Madness: Donald Trump, The Press, And The War Over The Truth, which was released in January 2018, discusses Donald Trump's ongoing fights with the news media during the first year of his presidency. The book argues that the media unfairly treated President Trump. According to a review by Jonathan Chait in New York Magazine, "To Kurtz... the ‘massive imbalance’ between Trump's coverage and coverage of other presidents can only be explained by media bias. He treats this premise as definitionally true — not defending it outright, but simply building his case as though no other explanation could even theoretically exist. And so the strange mission of his book is to analyze the hostile relationship between Trump and the mainstream news media without in any way acknowledging any background as to why."

Criticism 

Kurtz has publicly declined to state his political affiliation. As a high-profile media critic and analyst, Kurtz's political leanings and multiple employers and possible biases have been discussed by fellow media critics and pundits. Both liberal and conservative viewpoints have been observed in his writing. Journalist Mickey Kaus, reporting on and partially quoting from a letter by journalist Charles Kaiser in The New Republic, wrote that Kurtz "has large, non-technical conflicts of interest, since he free-lances and takes money 'from the people he writes about, from Time Warner to Condé Nast.'... One seemingly conflicting interest is Kurtz co-hosting CNN's Reliable Sources, in which he obtains monetary supplements as well as national renown."

Kurtz has received criticism for his apparent support of syndicated radio host Don Imus. Former Fox News commentator Bill O'Reilly has called out Kurtz for criticizing Fox News. The network covered a story about the United States Justice Department regarding its prosecution of members of the New Black Panther Party for accusations of voter intimidation during the 2008 United States Presidential Election. O'Reilly criticized network news media outlets, particularly Bob Schieffer of the CBS News talk show Face the Nation, for not asking Attorney General Eric Holder about the story. When Kurtz discussed the topic on Reliable Sources, he mentioned that Fox News was "pushing" the story. O'Reilly criticized Kurtz's description that Fox pushed the story and said that Kurtz's newspaper, The Washington Post, had its own ombudsman Andrew Alexander say that it regretted not pursuing the story earlier due to newsworthiness.

KURTZ: I think the argument that I've heard Olbermann make in the past about Fox News – it's not an argument that I embrace – is that, because it poses as a news organization and puts out dangerous misinformation is a cheerleader for the Bush administration, that it's misinforming our society. But you know what? They're entitled to do that.

Kurtz's 2008 Reliable Sources interview of Kimberly Dozier, a CBS reporter wounded in Iraq, was criticized by several members of the media because Kurtz's wife had been paid as a publicist for Dozier's memoir. During the interview, Kurtz praised Dozier and read passages of her book.

Personal life 

Kurtz married Sheri Annis in May 2003. Annis, a media consultant and political commentator, served as campaign spokesperson for Republican California Gov. Arnold Schwarzenegger and has worked on various conservative political initiatives, including California's Proposition 227 and Proposition 209.

References

External links

 Profile at Fox News
 Column archive at The Daily Beast
 Kurtz's Media Notes on Washingtonpost.com (up to October, 2010 when he left the Post)
 
 
 
 

1953 births
Living people
People from Sheepshead Bay, Brooklyn
Journalists from New York City
Television anchors from New York City
American columnists
American male journalists
American media critics
American television journalists
Jewish American journalists
CNN people
Fox News people
The Washington Post people
University at Buffalo alumni
Columbia University Graduate School of Journalism alumni
20th-century American journalists
21st-century American journalists
20th-century American Jews
21st-century American Jews